PT Semen Padang is the state-owned company that became oldest cement plant in Indonesia, having been founded in 1910.

The company owns the football club Semen Padang F.C., that competes in the Liga 2 (Indonesia).

History 

PT Semen Padang (Persero) was established on 18 March 1910 firstly named NV Nederlandsch Indische Portland Cement Maatschappij (NV NIPCM). The Company emerged to be the first cement plant in Indonesia. On 5 July 1958, the company was nationalized by the Government of the Republic of Indonesia. During this period, the Company started to develop itself by increasing the capacity of Indarung I Plant to 330.000 tons/year. Next, the company developed the capacity of its production by erecting Indarung II, III and IV Plants which, unlike that of Indarung I, apply dry process.

In 1995, the Government shifted its ownership in PT Semen Padang  to PT Semen Gresik (Persero) Tbk and in the same year approved the development of Indarung V. Presently, PT Semen Gresik (Persero) Tbk. owns 99.99% of the company's shares. The rest 0.01% is owned by Koperasi Keluarga Besar Semen Padang. The controlling share of PT Semen Gresik (Persero) Tbk. in the company (51.01%) is owned by the Government of the Republic of Indonesia, while the rest 48.09% is owned by various shareholders.

Production

Factory Capacity 

The total production capacity of PT Semen Padang is 8,400,000 tons/year, making it the largest cement producer in Indonesia, with details are as follows:

 Indarung II Factory = 860,000 tons / year
 Indarung III Factory = 720,000 tons / year
 Indarung IV Factory = 1,920,000 tons / year
 Indarung V Factory = 3,000,000 tons / year
 Indarung VI Factory = 1,500,000 tons / year
 Cement Mill Dumai = 900,000 tons / year

The Indarung I Factory has been deactivated since October 1999, with consideration of efficiency and pollution. The factory which was established on 18 March 1910 in its production process uses a wet process.

Foot note

References

External links 
 

Cement companies of Indonesia
Semen Indonesia Group
Indonesian brands